Celon may refer to:

In places
 Celon, Indre, commune of the Indre  in France
 Celón, a parish in Allande, a municipality within the province of Asturias, in northern Spain

In fiction:
 Celon (Middle-earth), a river in J. R. R. Tolkien's Middle-earth writings